La Riera is one of eleven parishes (administrative divisions) in Cangas de Onís, a municipality within the province and autonomous community of Asturias, by northern Spain's Picos de Europa mountains.

Villages
 La Riera
 Llerices

References

Parishes in Cangas de Onis